Orta Şurtan is a village in the Kalbajar District of Azerbaijan.

References

See also
Aşağı Şurtan – Lower Şurtan
Yuxarı Şurtan – Upper Şurtan

Populated places in Kalbajar District